Madison Nguyen is an American politician from California. She served on the San Jose City Council from 2005 to 2014, representing District 7, and she additionally served as Vice-Mayor from 2011 to 2014.  She was the first Vietnamese-American elected to the city council.

Nguyen previously served as the executive vice president of the Silicon Valley Organization, now known as the San Jose Chamber of Commerce.

Early life
Madison and her family escaped Vietnam on a small fishing boat when she was four years old. Her family then settled in various refugee camps in the Philippines until a Lutheran church sponsored them to Scottsdale, Arizona. Her father worked as a janitor, receiving a stipend of only $500 a month to support his wife and children. Eventually, he moved his family to Modesto, California, in search of employment for his family in the Central Valley. Madison worked in the fields alongside her parents as a teenager. She is one of nine siblings.

Madison received her Bachelor of Arts in History from the University of California, Santa Cruz. She received a master's degree from the University of Chicago.  She returned to California in 2000 to pursue a Ph.D. in sociology at UC Santa Cruz.

Political career

School board
Nguyen began to become more involved in politics in 2001, while working as a sociology instructor at De Anza College; inspired by MTV's "Rock the Vote" campaign, she and members of the Vietnamese community organised a voter drive in which nearly 5,000 new voters registered to vote for the first time. She followed that up with a run for a position on the Franklin-McKinley School District Board of Education, hoping that her election would encourage Vietnamese Americans to get more involved in local politics. Her win made her one of the first two school board officials of Vietnamese descent in the United States. The other, elected around the same time, was Lan Nguyen of Garden Grove, a city in southern California's Orange County. However, it was Nguyen's organisation of protests in support of Bich Cau Thi Tran, a Vietnamese woman shot to death by a San Jose police constable that brought her to the forefront of people's minds in the Vietnamese American community. Nguyen, who felt the incident was being ignored by the public and the media, organised a rally to which nearly 300 people showed up.

City Council
In September 2005, she ran for city council in a special election to replace Terry Gregory in District 7. Vietnamese Americans, who formed less than 10% of San Jose's population at the time, turned out in record numbers during the primary election in June to support Madison Nguyen and Linda Nguyen, pushing them ahead of seven other candidates. Madison Nguyen won 44% of the primary vote, while Linda Nguyen, a real estate attorney, received 27%. In the run-off, Madison Nguyen received 62% of the votes cast, beating out Linda Nguyen to become the first Vietnamese American to serve on the San Jose's City Council. e

District naming controversy and recall attempt

Nguyen's support from the Vietnamese American community suffered a sharp reversal in early January 2008, in a controversy over whether the Little Saigon district, an area of a Story Road in her council district with a large percentage of Vietnamese retailers, should be named as "Little Saigon" or "Little Saigon Business District". Little Saigon is a common name used for various other Vietnamese-American commercial enclaves, particularly known in Orange County, California. Nguyen suggested the name "Little Saigon Business District" after she heard from different groups in her council district who wanted the word "New" to be included in the name, indicating a new life in America after they left their homeland. She thought Saigon Business District was a good compromise between Little Saigon and New Saigon so she recommended Saigon Business District as the name for the designation. Supporters of the Little Saigon denounced Nguyen as a traitor to the community because she did not support what they deemed as the "majority" of the Vietnamese community supported, which was "Little Saigon." The City Council voted to name the business district as Little Saigon Business District.

After recurring protests in front of City Hall for several months, on 4 March 2008, the city council voted to rescind the "Little Saigon Business District" name, but stopped short of renaming it "Little Saigon". Instead, they proposed setting up a process by which business owners could choose district names. However, anger against Nguyen remained. On 22 April 2008, the issue was reopened with the submission of recall papers against Nguyen by the Recall Madison Nguyen committee. On 9 October the petition qualified for the 3 March 2009 ballot, having garnered more than 150% of the needed valid signatures. On 3 March 2009, voters rejected the recall attempt with a 55-45% vote. A year later, Nguyen won re-election and in 2011, she was nominated by Mayor Chuck Reed and was approved unanimously by the city council to be Vice Mayor. She is also the first Vietnamese Vice Mayor in the history of San Jose.

2014 mayoral campaign
Nguyen ran unsuccessfully in the 2014 San Jose mayoral election, placing third in the first round, thus, failing to advance to the runoff election.

Nguyen formally filed to run for mayor on December 19, 2012, becoming the second candidate to do so.

Per Mike Rosenberg of The Mercury News, Nguyen centered her candidacy heavily on her life story, with less emphasis on her record or policy positions. During her campaign, Rosenberg wrote that Nguyen, "has an inspiring rags-to-riches story stemming from her family’s escape from Vietnam and has built a coalition of supporters — especially the city’s large immigrant population — who see a rare politician they can connect with."

2016 State Assembly campaign
In April 2015, Madison Nguyen announced her intention to run for California State Assembly District 27, an open seat being vacated by term-limited Nora Campos.[circular reference] The primary election was in June 2016, followed by a November general election, which coincided with the next presidential contest. Nguyen began rolling out her campaign platform soon after her announcement. Her first significant proposal was to support a new University of California campus, and to locate it in San Jose. Her first notable endorsement came from San Jose Mayor Sam Liccardo. Other declared candidates included San Jose City Councillor Ash Kalra, Santa Clara County Board of Education Trustee Darcie Green, activist Cong Do, and Republican Van Le.

Madison won a decisive victory in the primary, with more than 11,000 more votes than her closest competitor.

Originally predicted to easily win the general election over Ash Kalra, she ultimately lost in an upset, in part after Kalra managed to run effective mailers focusing on police shortages in San Jose.

Subsequent career
In February 2017, Nguyen became executive director for the nonprofit Hunger at Home.

Nguyen served as the executive vice president of the Silicon Valley Organization from January 15, 2018, to 2021.

Electoral history

San Jose City Council

San Jose mayor

California state assembly

References

External links
Campaign homepage
Official page on the San Jose city government website
What's Happening in San Jose Vietnamese Community from the Vietnamese American Council; contains several news stories on Madison Nguyen
This American Life - Episode 381: Turncoat Prologue and Act One is about Madison Nguyen and the district naming controversy

1975 births
Living people
American women of Vietnamese descent in politics
California Democrats
People from Modesto, California
San Jose City Council members
University of California, Santa Cruz alumni
University of Chicago alumni
Vietnamese emigrants to the United States
Women city councillors in California
California politicians of Vietnamese descent
21st-century American women